The Grammy Award for Best Dance/Electronic Album is an award presented at the Grammy Awards — a ceremony that was established in 1958 — to recording artists for quality albums in the dance music and electronica genres. Honors in several categories are presented at the ceremony annually by the National Academy of Recording Arts and Sciences of the United States to "honor artistic achievement, technical proficiency and overall excellence in the recording industry, without regard to album sales or chart position.”

History
This award was first presented in 2005 to Basement Jaxx for the album Kish Kash.
From 2005 to 2011 the award was known as Best Electronic/Dance Album
From 2012 to 2014 the award was known as Best Dance/Electronica Album
From 2015 the award has been known as Best Dance/Electronic Album

In June 2014, NARAS announced a small change in the naming of the category, from Dance/Electronica to Dance/Electronic. It was agreed that "the title for this genre has evolved, and updating it more accurately represents the industry nomenclature of today.", according to the Grammy committee.

According to the category description guide, the award is presented "for albums containing at least 51% playing time of new vocal or instrumental electronica/dance recordings". It is intended for "groove-oriented recordings with electronic-based instrumentation". Compilation or remixed recording albums are not eligible for this category.

The award goes to the artist, producer and engineer/mixer, provided they worked on more than 50% of the playing time on the album. A producer or engineer who worked on less than 50% of playing time, as well as a mastering engineer, can apply for a Winners Certificate.

Skrillex and The Chemical Brothers have received the award three times, while Daft Punk received it twice. The Chemical Brothers hold the record for most nominations with six.  Disclosure, Deadmau5 and Robyn hold the record for most nominations without a win with three.

Lady Gaga’s The Fame in 2010 and Beyoncé’s Renaissance in 2023 are the only albums to have also received nominations for the Grammy Award for Album of the Year, with Daft Punk’s Random Access Memories winning both in 2014.

Recipients

 Each year is linked to the article about the Grammy Awards held that year.

Artists with multiple wins

3 wins
 The Chemical Brothers
 Skrillex

2 wins
 Daft Punk

Artists with multiple nominations

6 nominations
 The Chemical Brothers

3 nominations
 Daft Punk
 Deadmau5
 Disclosure
 Robyn
 Skrillex

2 nominations
 Bonobo
 The Crystal Method
 Goldfrapp
 David Guetta
 Diplo
 Flume
 Justice
 Kaskade
 Kraftwerk
 LCD Soundsystem
 Paul Oakenfold
 Odesza
 Pet Shop Boys
 Rüfüs Du Sol
 Sylvan Esso
 Tycho

See also

 Dance Music Hall of Fame

References
General

  Note: User must select the "Dance" category as the genre under the search feature.
 

Specific

2005 establishments in the United States
Album awards
Awards established in 2005
Dance music awards
Dance Electronica Album